Bora Bora is the fourth studio album by Brazilian rock band Os Paralamas do Sucesso, released in February 1988. Characterized by a tropical, Caribbean-esque instrumentation, the album's main hits include "O Beco", "Uns Dias" and "Quase um Segundo". It sold more than 20,000 copies in Europe.

Jamaican reggae deejay Peter Metro (credited as Peter Clarke) made a special appearance on this album.

Track listing

Note
 The track "The Can" is not included in the vinyl version.

Personnel
Os Paralamas do Sucesso
 Bi Ribeiro – bass
 João Barone – drums, percussion
 Herbert Vianna – guitar, vocals

Additional musicians
 Charly García – piano in "Quase um Segundo"
 Don Harris – trumpet
 George Israel – saxophone in "O  Fundo do Coração"
 Humberto Araújo – saxophone
 João Fera – keyboards
 Mattos Nascimento – trombone
 Peter Clarke – toast in "Don't Give Me That"

1988 albums
Os Paralamas do Sucesso albums
EMI Records albums